Stadion Lugovi is a football stadium in Budva, Montenegro. It is currently used mostly for football matches and is the home ground of FK Mogren. The stadium holds 1,500 people.

History
The stadium was built in the 1960s and renovated at the start of the 1990s. It's situated near the main beach in Budva and it's the home ground of FK Mogren.
On the stadium exists two stands, both with capacity of 750 seats.
Plans of owner (Municipality of Budva) are to demolish the stadium, because it is in an attractive location.
In the meantime (2009-2010), city government built football pitches complex near the Jaz beach, 5 kilometers from Budva town center.

Pitch and conditions
The pitch measures 110 x 70 meters. Stadium didn't met UEFA criteria for European competitions. International games at the territory of Budva municipality are playing at Stadion Pod Malim Brdom in Petrovac.

Music concerts
From 2005, Stadion Lugovi hosted numerous music concerts during the summer season in Budva. Among many musicians, most attended was gig of David Guetta at July 29, 2011. Concert was attended by 6,000 spectators.

See also
FK Mogren
Budva

External links
 Stadium information

References 

Multi-purpose stadiums in Montenegro
Football venues in Montenegro
Football in Montenegro
FK Mogren
Sport in Budva